Ape Action Africa is a non-profit NGO founded in 1996 dedicated to the conservation of endangered gorillas and chimpanzees, threatened by the bushmeat trade in Central and West Africa. Ape Action Africa manages the rescue and rehabilitation of Great apes across much of Cameroon, with a large sanctuary in the Mefou forest. With more than 300 primates in its care, Ape Action Africa is now one of the largest conservation projects of its kind in Africa. Many of the animals arrive at the sanctuary as orphans, mainly due to the illegal bushmeat trade, which has grown in recent years as a result of deforestation of the Cameroonian jungle.

At the frontline of the organisation is Rachel Hogan, originally from Birmingham, who now lives full-time in the jungle.

Ape Action Africa is featured in the 2006 TV series Going Ape.

On 22 November 2010, one of the founding directors of Ape Action Africa, Avi Sivan, died in a helicopter crash while travelling between the cities of Douala and Yaoundé in Cameroon.

On 24 December 2010, the board of trustees of the charity announced Rachel Hogan as the new Director and Bibila Tafon (Babs) as the new Manager of the Mefou National Park.

On 24 April 2014, the Dublin premiere of the film Tarzan was in aid of Ape Action Africa, supported by the lead, Kellan Lutz, who is himself interested in conservation.

History

Ape Action Africa was established in 1996 as a UK charity called CWAF, or Cameroon Wildlife Aid Fund, and its primary objective was to improve living conditions for primates housed at Mvog-Betsi Zoo in Yaoundé, Cameroon. During 12 years of operation, CWAF expanded its mission significantly to provide sanctuary for wild orphans of the illegal bushmeat and pet trades in Cameroon.

The charity has long been associated with Bristol Zoo, sharing some trustees with the Clifton charity. It is also supported by local businesses and several celebrities.

CWAF rebranded as Ape Action Africa in 2008 and now uses email campaigns and Facebook to communicate with supporters.

Ape Action is a member of the Pan African Sanctuary Alliance (PASA).

Rachel Hogan, Director
Rachel Hogan arrived at the charity in 2001 on a three-month volunteer placement. She was about to leave for home when a two-week-old gorilla arrived and Rachel stayed to hand rear him. She has been in Cameroon ever since. Her role in the project developed and when Avi and Talila Sivan were appointed directors in 2003, she was appointed manager of Mefou National Park.

During her tenure as manager, Rachel has been a key part of the team that has transformed Mefou into one of the largest, best known primate conservation charities in Africa. The Sivans have overseen vast improvements in the enclosures, veterinary care, transport, security and infrastructure at Mefou. Rachel has worked closely with Talila on a daily basis, resulting in her development from a volunteer with a single-minded animal focus to a confident manager, driven by her passion for primates.

Bibila Tafon (Babs), Manager - Mefou National Park
Babila Tafon has worked for Ape Action Africa since its inception 14 years ago as CWAF and became manager of our team working with the primates in Mvog Betsi Zoo in Yaoundé in 2003. He has developed the veterinary team over the years and he now has two veterinary technicians to assist him in providing excellent veterinary care to hundreds of primates. Tafon regularly attends the PASA (Pan African Sanctuaries Alliance) vet workshops and he has travelled to the US and the UK for vet conferences and training.

Volunteer programme

Ape Action Africa offers a limited number of self-funded volunteer placements for one- to three-months in the Mefou National Park in Cameroon to people aged over 21 with a passion for primate conservation and Africa.

References

External links
Ape Action Africa - www.apeactionafrica.org

Animal reintroduction
Animal welfare organizations based in Cameroon
Nature conservation in Cameroon
Environmental organizations based in Cameroon
Organizations established in 1996
Primate sanctuaries
Wildlife sanctuaries of Africa